The 2017–18 WRU Championship was the sixth season of the WRU Championship, the second tier of club rugby in Wales run by the Welsh Rugby Union. It is the second season to feature 12 teams, reduced from 14 in previous seasons. This season is the second to be "ring-fenced" with the champion club not being promoted due to changes in the Principality Premiership. The competition was won again by Pontypool who completed the feat of going a whole season unbeaten, winning all 22 games. The bottom two clubs that were relegated were Skewen and Glynneath (both to 1 West Cenrtral).

Structure 
Each team in the Championship will play each other twice on a home and away basis for a total of 22 matches played each. The team with the most points at the end of the season will be declared the winners. The winning club will not be promoted due to "ring-fencing" of the Premiership. The bottom two clubs at the end of the season will be relegated to Division 1 (based on geographical location).

Teams 
At the end of last season, Glamorgan Wanderers and Dunvant were relegated to Division 1 East Central and West Central respectively. This season saw the return of playoffs between the Division 1 East and East Central champions and Division 1 West and West Central champions to determine which clubs will participate in this year's Championship. The promoted clubs were East champions Rhydyfelin and West Central champions Trebanos. Both clubs beat Treorchy and Kidwelly respectively. Both clubs were making their debuts in the competition.

Promotion play-offs 

Rhydyfelin won 52–37 on aggregate.

Trebanos won 56–23 on aggregate.

Standings

External links 
 

Welsh Championship
2017–18 in Welsh rugby union
Wales